The undulated tinamou (Crypturellus undulatus) is a species of ground bird found in a wide range of wooded habitats in eastern and northern South America.

Etymology
Its generic name Crypturellus is formed from three Latin or Greek words -  kruptos meaning "covered" or "hidden", oura meaning "tail", and ellus meaning "diminutive".  Therefore, Crypturellus means small, hidden tail. The specific name undulatus originates from the Latin word unda, meaning "wave", and means "furnished with wave-like markings".

Taxonomy
All tinamous are from the family Tinamidae, so are also ratites.  Unlike other ratites, tinamous can fly, although in general, they are not strong fliers.  All ratites evolved from prehistoric flying birds, and tinamous are the closest living relative of these birds.

Subspecies
 C. u. manapiare is only known with certainty from the vicinity of the Ventuari River in northern Amazonas State in Venezuela, but probably also occurs in southwestern Amazonas State.
 C. u. simplex occurs in southern Guyana, French Guiana (where only known from sight records), and northeastern Brazil (east of the Rio Negro and north of the Amazon River).
 C. u. adspersus occurs in Brazil south of the Amazon River, from the Tapajós River to the Madeira River.
 C. u. yapura occurs in southeastern Colombia, eastern Ecuador, northeastern and east-central Peru, and western Brazil (east to Rio Negro and the Purús River).
 C. u. vermiculatus occurs in eastern Brazil from Maranhão, Tocantins, and Mato Grosso and east.
 C. u. undulatus occurs in southeastern Peru, eastern and northern Bolivia, the Pantanal region in Brazil, Paraguay, and northern Argentina.

The exact distribution limits of some of the subspecies, though, are unclear. Notably, the population between the Madeira and Purús Rivers (between generally reported range of C. u. adspersus and C. u. yapura) and the population between the Tapajós and Araguaia Rivers (between generally reported range of C. u. adspersus and C. u. vermiculatus) appear not to have been assigned to subspecies.

Description
Depending on subspecies, it is overall brownish tinged grey to various extents, and has a strong, black, barred to faint vermiculated pattern on the back and neck (for example, while C. u. undulatus is relatively rich brown and strongly barred, C. u. yapura is darker, more grey-tinged, and only has faint vermiculations). It has a whitish throat, and the remainders of its underparts are olive-grey to buff with dark vermiculation on its lower flanks and vent. Its bill is black above and grey below. The legs and feet are grey, dull yellow, or greenish.

Behavior
The nest of the undulated tinamou consists of a depression on the ground, where the female lays around three glossy vinaceous, pink or light-grey eggs. The incubation time is 17 days in captivity. It feeds on small fruits, seeds, and insects.

As other tinamous, the undulated tinamou is secretive, and more frequently heard than seen. The song, commonly given throughout the day, consists of a deep, three- or four-noted whistle, which has been described by the onomatopoetic com-pra pan ("buy bread" in Spanish) or Eu sou jaó ("I am undulated tinamou" in Portuguese).

Habitat
It occurs in a wide range of wooded habitats, ranging from dense, humid Amazonian forests, to dry, relatively open savanna-woodland. Although most of the range of the undulated tinamou is in the Amazon Basin, significant parts are in drier habitats such as the Cerrado (most of the range of C. u. vermiculatus is in the Cerrado region). Though generally considered resident, minor seasonal movements between habitats do occur locally.

Conservation
Though heavily hunted in some regions, the undulated tinamou remains common in most parts of its range.

References

External links
Undulated Tinamou videos, photos & sounds on the Internet Bird Collection
Photo of Crypturellus u. undulatus. Eric Gallardo. WikiAves.
Photo of Crypturellus undulatus adspersus. Anselmo d'Affonseca. WikiAves.
Photo of Crypturellus undulatus simplex. Kurazo M. Okada Aguiar. WikiAves.
Photo of Crypturellus undulatus vermiculatus. Geiser Trivelato. WikiAves.
 
 Sounds on the xeno canto collection

undulated tinamou
undulated tinamou
Birds of the Amazon Basin
Birds of the Pantanal
Birds of Brazil
undulated tinamou